Detlef Rudolf Quadfasel is a professor of Geophysics at Niels Bohr Institute for Astronomy, Physics and Geophysics at Copenhagen University and Oceanography at the Institut für Meereskunde, Hamburg. He is joint editor of Progress in Oceanography. He is involved in a number of projects, including Climate monitoring - Greenland Sea Convection.

External links
 https://web.archive.org/web/20070612072741/http://www.ifm.uni-hamburg.de/~wwwro/quadfasel/publications.html
 http://arquivo.pt/wayback/20141126093524/http%3A//www.eu%2Dthor.eu/
 Nature N&V quoting Quadfasel

References

 "THOR" oder das Überleben des Golfstroms: https://cordis.europa.eu/project/rcn/88858_de.html
 "NACLIM" North Atlantic Climate: https://cordis.europa.eu/project/rcn/105518_en.html

German geophysicists
German oceanographers
Living people
Year of birth missing (living people)